The Dodecanese (Dodekánisa) are a group of 15 larger plus 150 smaller Greek islands in the southeastern Aegean Sea and Eastern Mediterranean, off the coast of Turkey's Anatolia, of which 26 are inhabited. This island group generally defines the eastern limit of the Sea of Crete. They belong to the wider Southern Sporades island group.

Rhodes has been the area's dominant island since antiquity. Of the others, Kos and Patmos are historically the more important; the remaining twelve are Agathonisi, Astypalaia, Halki, Kalymnos, Karpathos, Kasos, Leipsoi, Leros, Nisyros, Symi, Tilos, and Kastellorizo. Other islands in the chain include Alimia, Arkoi, Farmakonisi, Gyali, Kinaros, Levitha, Marathos, Nimos, Pserimos, Saria, Strongyli and Syrna.

Name
The name "Dodecanese" (older form ἡ Δωδεκάνησος, hē Dōdekanēsos; modern τα Δωδεκάνησα, ta Dōdekanēsa), meaning "The Twelve Islands", or Oniki Adalar in Turkish, denotes today an island group in the southeastern Aegean Sea, comprising fifteen major islands (Agathonisi, Astypalaia, Chalki, Kalymnos, Karpathos, Kasos, Kastellorizo, Kos, Lipsi, Leros, Nisyros, Patmos, Rhodes, Symi, and Tilos) and 93 smaller islets. Since Antiquity, these islands formed part of the group known as the "Southern Sporades" (Νότιες Σποράδες).

The name Dōdekanēsos first appears in Byzantine sources in the 8th century, as a naval command under a droungarios, encompassing the southern Aegean Sea, which eventually evolved into the Theme of Samos. However it was not applied to the current island group, but to the twelve Cyclades islands clustered around Delos. The name may indeed be of far earlier date, and modern historians suggest that the 12 islands mentioned by Strabo (Geographica Χ.485) was the origin of the term. The term remained in use throughout the medieval period and was still used for the Cyclades in both colloquial usage and scholarly Greek-language literature until the 18th century.

The transfer of the name to the present-day Dodecanese has its roots in the Ottoman period. Following the Ottoman conquest in 1522, the two larger islands, Rhodes and Kos, came under direct Ottoman rule, while the others, of which the twelve main islands were usually named, enjoyed extensive privileges pertaining to taxation and self-government. Concerted attempts to abolish these privileges were made after 1869, as the Ottoman Empire attempted to modernize and centralize its administrative structure, and the last vestiges of the old privileges were finally abolished after the Young Turks took power in 1908. It was at that time that the press in the independent Kingdom of Greece began referring to the twelve privileged islands (Astypalaia, Chalki, Ikaria, Kalymnos, Karpathos, Kasos, Kastellorizo, Leros, Nisyros, Patmos, Symi, Tilos), in the context of their attempts to preserve their privileges, collectively as the "Dodecanese". Shortly after, in 1912, most of the Southern Sporades were captured by the Italians in the Italo-Turkish War, except for Ikaria, which joined Greece in 1912 during the First Balkan War, and Kastellorizo, which came under Italian rule only in 1921. The place of the latter two was taken by Kos and Rhodes, bringing the number of the major islands under Italian rule back to twelve. Thus, when the Greek press began agitating for the cession of the islands to Greece in 1913, the term used was still the "Dodecanese". The Italian occupation authorities helped to establish the term when they named the islands under their control "Rhodes and the Dodecanese" (Rodi e Dodecaneso), adding Leipsoi to the list of the major islands to make up for considering Rhodes separately.

By 1920, the name had become firmly established for the entire island group, a fact acknowledged by the Italian government when it appointed the islands' first civilian governor, Count , as "Viceroy of the Dodecanese". As the name was associated with Greek irredentism, from 1924 Mussolini's Fascist regime tried to abolish its use by referring to them as the "Italian Islands of the Aegean", but this name never acquired any wider currency outside Italian administrative usage. The islands joined Greece in 1947 following as the "Governorate-General of the Dodecanese" (Γενική Διοίκησις Δωδεκανήσου), since 1955 the "Dodecanese Prefecture" (Νομός Δωδεκανήσου).

History

Pre-history and the Archaic period
The Dodecanese have been inhabited since prehistoric times. In the Neopalatial period on Crete, the islands were heavily Minoanized (contact beginning in the second millennium BC). Following the downfall of the Minoans, the islands were ruled by the Mycenaean Greeks from circa 1400 BC, until the arrival of the Dorians circa 1100 BC. It is in the Dorian period that they began to prosper as an independent entity, developing a thriving economy and culture through the following centuries. By the early Archaic period Rhodes and Kos emerged as the major islands in the group, and in the 6th century BC the Dorians founded three major cities on Rhodes (Lindos, Kameiros and Ialyssos). Together with the island of Kos and the cities of Knidos and Halicarnassos on the mainland of Asia Minor, these made up the Dorian Hexapolis.

Classical period

This development was interrupted around 499 BC by the Persian Wars, during which the islands were captured by the Persians for a brief period. Following the defeat of the Persians by the Athenians in 478 BC, the cities joined the Athenian-dominated Delian League. When the Peloponnesian War broke out in 431 BC, they remained largely neutral although they were still members of the League.

By the time the Peloponnesian War ended in 404 BC, the Dodecanese were mostly removed from the larger Aegean conflicts, and had begun a period of relative quiet and prosperity. In 408 BC, the three cities of Rhodes had united to form one state, which built a new capital on the northern end of the island, also named Rhodes; this united Rhodes was to dominate the region for the coming millennia. Other islands in the Dodecanese also developed into significant economic and cultural centers; most notably, Kos served as the site of the school of medicine founded by Hippocrates.

However, the Peloponnesian War had so weakened the entire Greek civilization's military strength that it lay open to invasion. In 357 BC, the islands were conquered by the king Mausolus of Caria, then in 340 BC by the Persians. But this second period of Persian rule proved to be nearly as short as the first, and the islands became part of the rapidly growing Macedonian Empire as Alexander the Great swept through and defeated the Persians in 332 BC, to the great relief of the islands' inhabitants.

Following the death of Alexander, the islands, and even Rhodes itself, were split up among the many generals who contended to succeed him. The islands formed strong commercial ties with the Ptolemies in Egypt, and together they formed the Rhodo-Egyptian alliance which controlled trade throughout the Aegean in the 3rd century BC. Led by Rhodes, the islands developed into maritime, commercial and cultural centers: coins of Rhodes circulated almost everywhere in the Mediterranean, and the islands' schools of philosophy, literature and rhetoric were famous. The Colossus of Rhodes, built in 304 BC, perhaps best symbolized their wealth and power.

In 164 BC, Rhodes signed a treaty with Rome, and the islands became aligned to greater or lesser extent with the Roman Republic while mostly maintaining their autonomy. Rhodes quickly became a major schooling center for Roman noble families, and, as the islands (and particularly Rhodes) were important allies of Rome, they enjoyed numerous privileges and generally friendly relations. These were eventually lost in 42 BC, in the turmoil following the assassination of Julius Caesar in 44 BC, after which Cassius invaded and sacked the islands. Thereafter, they became part of the Roman Empire proper. Titus made Rhodes capital of the Provincia Insularum, and eventually the islands were joined with Crete as part of the 18th Province of the Roman Empire.

In the 1st century, Saint Paul visited the islands twice, and Saint John visited numerous times; they succeeded in converting the islands to Christianity, placing them among the first dominantly Christian regions. Saint John eventually came to reside among them, being exiled to Patmos, where he wrote his famous Revelation.

Middle Ages

As the Roman Empire split in AD 395 into Eastern and Western halves, the islands became part of the Eastern part, which later evolved into the Byzantine Empire. They would remain there for nearly a thousand years, though these were punctuated by numerous invasions. It was during this period that they began to re-emerge as an independent entity, and the term Dodecanese itself dates to around the 8th century. Copious evidence of the Eastern Roman period remains on the islands today, most notably in hundreds of churches from the period which can be seen in various states of preservation.

In the X-XI century, on behalf the Roman Empire of Constantinople all the area was controlled and secured with trade duty rights, by powerful maritime city-state fleets of Genoa (with the clan of Vignolo de'Vignoli) and Venice (with the clan of Cornaros); When the Genoese managed to snatch a treaty from the Paleologos Emperors of Costantinople , they began invading portions of the Dodecanese, and other eastern isle from Chios to Rhodes which had remained under the nominal power of the Empire of Nicea;  Genoese family clans (Moresco, Vignoli, Giustiniani, Spinola and others) each held some islands and they was granted to rule, trade and to exploit raw materials (masticha, etc.), in exchange for maritime protection, while Orthodox monks ruled on Patmos and Leros. Finally, the Byzantine era came to an end when the islands were rented and sold by Genoeses for the venue of the Knights Hospitaller (Knights of St John): Rhodes was reinforced in 1309, and in the rest of the islands the Knights gradually built castles and fortress over the next few decades, while still the genoese fleet was in charge of the sea routes and kept their bases and trading stores (Empori). The Knights made Rhodes their stronghold, transforming its capital into a grandiose medieval city dominated by an impressive fortress, and scattered fortresses and citadels through the rest of the islands as well.

These massive fortifications proved sufficient to repel invasions by the Sultan of Egypt in 1444 and Mehmed II in 1480. Finally, however, the citadel at Rhodes fell to the large army of Suleiman the Magnificent in 1522, and the other islands were overrun within the year. The few remaining Knights fled to Malta.

Ottoman rule

Thus began a period of several hundred years in the Ottoman Empire. The Dodecanese formed a separate province within the Eyalet of the Archipelago. The population was allowed to retain a number of privileges provided it submitted to Ottoman rule. By Suleiman's edict, they paid a special tax in return for a special autonomous status that prohibited Ottoman generals from interfering in their civil affairs or mistreating the population. These guarantees, combined with a strategic location at the crossroads of Mediterranean shipping, allowed the islands to prosper. The overwhelmingly Greek population (only Rhodes and Kos had Turkish communities) leaned heavily towards Greece following its declaration of independence in 1822, and many of the islanders joined the Greek War of Independence, with the result that the northern portion of the Dodecanese (including Samos) became briefly the Greek provinces of the Eastern Sporades and Southern Sporades. Kasos in particular played a prominent role due to its skilled mariners, until its destruction by the Egyptians in 1824. Most of the islands were slated to become part of the new Greek state in the London Protocol of 1828, but when Greek independence was recognized in the London Protocol of 1830, the islands were left outside the new Kingdom of Greece. Indeed, the 19th century turned out to be one of the islands' most prosperous, and a number of mansions date from this era.

Turks of the Dodecanese

There is a Turkish Muslim minority living in Rhodes and Kos. Sources have variously estimated the Turkish population of Kos and Rhodes to be 5,000, 6,000, or 7,000.

Italian rule

After the outbreak of the Italian-Turkish war over Libya, in early 1912 Italy, in order to apply pressure on the Ottoman government closer to its metropolitan territories, occupied all the present-day Dodecanese except for Kastellorizo.

After the end of the war according to the Treaty of Ouchy, Italy maintained the occupation of the islands as guarantee for the execution of the treaty. The occupation continued after Italy declared war on the Ottoman Empire (21 August 1915) during the First World War.

During the war, the islands became an important naval base for Britain and France; Italy was allied with both nations during World War I. The Dodecanese were used as a staging area for numerous campaigns, most famously the one at Gallipoli. Some of the smaller islands were occupied by the French and British, but Rhodes remained under Italian occupation. In 1915, the French also occupied Kastellorizo.

Following the war, the Tittoni–Venizelos agreement, signed on 29 July 1919, called for the smaller islands to join with Greece, while Italy maintained control of Rhodes. The treaty further outlined an exchange where Italy would receive Antalya for southwest Anatolia. The Greek defeat in the Greco-Turkish War and the foundation of modern Turkey prevented the exchange. Italy formally annexed the Dodecanese as the Possedimenti Italiani dell'Egeo under the terms of the Treaty of Lausanne. Mussolini embarked on a program of Italianization, hoping to make Rhodes a modern transportation hub that would serve as a focal point for the spread of Italian culture in the Levant. The islands were overwhelmingly Greek-speaking, with a Turkish-speaking minority and an even smaller Ladino-speaking Jewish minority. Immigrant Italian speakers were a marginal language community.

Although the Italian state placed the islands under the direction of the Ministry of Foreign Affairs, governance of them was strongly tied to the project for an Italian empire in the Mediterranean and to the Italian colonies in Libya, Somalia, Eritrea, and after 1936, in Ethiopia. 

As part of securing sovereignty in the islands, Italy created and applied a form of imperial citizenship for the local population unique to its overseas empire. Called Italian Aegean citizenship (cittadinanza egea italiana), this form of citizenship was inclusive of local political rights and exclusive of military service. After 1934, Dodecanese citizens could complete military service and apply to become full Italian citizens, an option which many locals chose while supporting Italian Fascism and seeing the Italian empire as promoting their financial well-being. Italian Aegean citizenship also ensured the islands were exempted from the exchange of Greek and Turkish minority populations in the Aegean, a provision of the Second Lausanne Treaty that ended the Greco-Turkish War following World War One the collapse of the Ottoman empire. After 1934, it was also possible to acquire Italian Aegean citizenship from abroad and to transmit Italian Aegean citizenship on the principle of patrilineal descent. This reform mirrored the principle of jus sanguinis which provides the basis of Italian citizenship and it was especially intended for the large Greek speaking Dodecanese-origin emigrant community residing in Egypt. 

The Fascist administration sought to modernize the islands, eradicating malaria, constructing hospitals, aqueducts, a power plant to provide Rhodes' capital with electric lighting, and establishing the Dodecanese cadastre. The main castle of the Knights of St. John was also rebuilt. The concrete-dominated Fascist architectural style detracted significantly from the islands' picturesque scenery (and also reminded the inhabitants of Italian rule), and has consequently been largely demolished or remodeled, apart from the famous example of the Leros town of Lakki, which remains a prime example of the architecture.

From 1936 to 1940 Cesare Maria De Vecchi acted as Governor of the Italian Islands of the Aegean promoting the official use of the Italian language and favoring a process of Italianization, interrupted by the beginning of World War II. In the 1936 Italian census of the Dodecanese islands, the total population was 129,135, of which 7,015 were Italians.

World War II

During World War II, Italy joined the Axis Powers, which used the Dodecanese as a naval staging area for their invasion of Crete in 1941. After the surrender of Italy in September 1943, the islands briefly became a battleground between the Germans and Allied forces, including the Italians. The Germans prevailed in the Dodecanese Campaign, and although they were driven out of mainland Greece in 1944, the Dodecanese remained occupied until the end of the war in 1945, during which time nearly the entire Jewish population of 6,000 was deported and killed. Only 1,200 of these Ladino-speaking Jews survived by escaping to the nearby coast of Turkey. On 8 May 1945 the German garrison commander Otto Wagener surrendered the islands to the British on Rhodes handing over 5,000 German and 600 Italian military personnel.

Post-World War II
Following the war, the islands became a British military protectorate, and were almost immediately allowed to run their own civil affairs, upon which the islands became informally united with Greece, though under separate sovereignty and military control. Despite objections from Turkey, which desired the islands as well, they were formally united with Greece by the 1947 Peace Treaty with Italy.

As a legacy of its former status as a jurisdiction separate from Greece, it is still considered a separate "entity" for amateur radio purposes, essentially maintaining its status as an independent country "on the air." Amateur radio call signs in the Dodecanese begin with the prefix SV5 instead of SV for Greece.

The 70th anniversary of the Dodecanese enosis was marked in 2017, with the Greek Parliament holding a special celebratory session for the event.

Today, Rhodes and the Dodecanese are popular travel destinations.

Administration

The Dodecanese Prefecture was one of the prefectures of Greece. As a part of the 2011 Kallikratis reform, the prefecture was abolished, and its territory was divided into four regional units, within the South Aegean administrative region:
 Kalymnos
 Karpathos
 Kos
 Rhodes

Municipalities and communities
The prefecture was subdivided into the following municipalities and communities. These have been reorganised at the 2011 Kallikratis reform as well.

Provinces
Until 1997, the Prefecture of the Dodecanese was subdivided into provinces:
 Province of Patmos – Patmos
 Province of Kalymnos – Kalymnos
 Province of Kos – Kos
 Province of Rhodes – Rhodes City
 Province of Karpathos & Kasos – Karpathos

Cuisine

Local specialities of the Dodecanese include:

Avranies
Koulouria (Κουλουρία)
Pitaroudia
Pouggia (Πουγγιά)
Tsirigia
Fanouropita (dessert)
Katimeria (dessert)
Melekouni (dessert)
Pouggakia (dessert)
Takakia or Mantinades (dessert)

See also
List of settlements in the Dodecanese
List of islands of Greece

References

 
 
 
 McGuire, Valerie (2020). Italy's Sea: Empire and Nation in the Mediterranean, 1895-1945. Liverpool: Liverpool University Press.

External links

Dodecanese Official website of the Greek National Tourism Organisation

 
Prefectures of Greece
Archipelagoes of Greece
Landforms of the South Aegean